CKMH-FM is a Canadian radio station that broadcasts an active rock format at 105.3 FM in Medicine Hat, Alberta. The station is branded as 105.3 Rock and is currently owned by Rogers Sports & Media.

The station was licensed by the Canadian Radio-television and Telecommunications Commission in 2007. After beginning on-air testing on January 29, 2008, CKMH signed on February 25, 2008 at 1:05 PM.

References

External links
 Rogers Media Medicine Hat Radio Stations
 105.3 Rock
 
 

Kmh
Kmh
Kmh
Radio stations established in 2008
2008 establishments in Alberta